St Mary the Virgin Church (known locally as St Mary-at-Latton Church) is located in Latton, Harlow, Essex, England. It is an Anglican church (Church of England) and is liberal catholic in tradition. The church building is Grade I listed.

Description and history
St Mary the Virgin Church was the place of worship for the ancient parish of Latton. Following the creation of Harlow New Town in 1947 and the subsequent expansion in population the parish was divided in three with the northern portion retaining the name of Latton. 

The Norman Church was built in 1087. A Norman window is present in the south wall and 
the Norman door arch is visible above the now disused south door.
The West tower had been built by 1234.

The north chapel for Sir Peter Arderne's chantry was completed in 1466. Some fragments of wall decoration are still visible. The altar tomb of Sir Peter Arderne and his wife Bohun, is set in an opening between the chapel and chancel and has fine brass effigies.

In 1562 the porch was added by the Altham family owners of the Mark Hall Estate and in the late 16th century the tower and the west end of the nave were rebuilt.

About 1800 the outside north wall of the nave was faced with brick and the doorway and
windows were closed off and plastered over.

Many changes were made during the 19th century including the restoration of the 
interior in 1848 and extensive repairs to the tower in 1873 and to the 
chancel in 1888.

The church was damaged by a V-1 flying bomb in 1945. This resulted in the loss of stained glass windows on the south side of the church. The church reopened in 1950 after extensive repairs.

In 1964 further damage was caused by a fire resulting in the church being completely restored in 1965. A vestry was built on the north side of the nave in 1971 and the tower was again restored in 1977.

Monuments

The church contains many monuments erected for members of the families who have owned
the nearby Mark Hall Estate including the altar tomb of Sir Peter Arderne and his wife
with fine brass effigies (1467), a brass probably of Sir Peter's daughter Elizabeth 
and her husband Richard Harper (1492) and an alabaster monument showing the kneeling 
figures of James Altham, his wife, and 11 children (1583).

There are also brasses to Frances wife of Richard Franklin (1604) and Emanuel Wolley
(1617) and wife Margaret (1635).

Sir Edward Altham has a marble monument with pilasters, pediment, urns, and angels
dating from 1632 and there is a Wall tablet in memory of the vicar Thomas Denne dating 
from 1680.

There are also wall tablets to other Althams and to members of the Lushington,
Burgoyne, and Arkwright families.

Vicars of St Mary's
The following priests have served as vicar of St Mary's since the 12th Century:
c1198: Roger and Anfred, Priests of Latton, possibly joint Rectors.
c1220–1234: Ernold, Chaplain of Latton, fell to his death from the church tower in 1234.
c1260: Simon, Rector, living in c1260.
c1317: Walter mentioned in 1317 as late rector.
c1358: Roger de Overe, recorded in 1358, was the first known vicar.
1361: William of Gaddesden, 1361 instituted vicar in 1361, was a canon of Latton.
1430–1503: There were 14 successive vicars, at least 7 of whom left on resignation.
1503–1600: 8 Vicars. TBC.
1600–1632: The Rev. Thomas Denne.
1632–80: The Rev. Thomas Denne Jr.
1680–1705: The Rev. Michael Altham. 
1705–30: The Rev. Roger Altham.
1730-1758: The Rev. James Altham, vicar of Latton.
1758–1801: 1 Vicar. TBC.
1801–c1820~ The Rev. Charles Miller (retired from Latton). 
1820–1850: The Rev. Joseph Arkwright.
 1850–64: The Rev. Julius Arkwright.
 1864–71: ??
 1871–1886: The Rev. William Oliver. 
 1886–1905: The Rev. Spencer Nairne.
1905–42: The Rev. Austin Oliver.
 1951–54: The Rev. J. Oliver White. 
1954–c1979: The Rev. Peter O’beirne.
1979–1988: The Rev. John Pratt.
Bef.1992–Retired 1999: The Rev. Peter Beech.
 1999–2009: The Rev. Shaun Conlon.
 2010–present: The Rev. Lynn Hurry.

Census Information

1841 Census
Rev. Joseph Arkwright
Vicar of Latton (1820-1850)
At Mark Hall, Latton. As N/a.

1851 Census
Rev. Julius Arkwright
Vicar of Latton (1850-1864)
At Latton Vicarage, Latton. As the “Vicar of Latton.”

1861 Census
Rev. Samuel W Lloyd
Curate of Latton
At Latton Vicarage, Latton. As the “Curate of Latton.”

1871 Census
Rev. William Oliver
Vicar of Latton (1871-1886)
At Latton Vicarage, Latton. As the “Vicar of Latton”.

1881 Census
Rev. William Oliver
Vicar of Latton (1871-1886)
At Latton Vicarage, Latton. As the “Vicar of Latton.”

1891 Census
Rev. Spencer Nairne
Vicar of Latton (1886–1905)
At Vicarage, Latton Street, Latton. As the “Vicar of Latton.”

1901 Census
Rev. Spencer Nairne
Vicar of Latton (1886–1905)
At Latton Vicarage, Latton. As “Clergyman, Church of England.”

1911 Census
Rev. Austin Oliver
Vicar of Latton (1905–1942)
At Latton Vicarage, Harlow, Essex. As “Clerk in Holy Orders.”

1921 Census
Rev. Austin Oliver
Vicar of Latton (1905–1942)
At Latton Vicarage, Latton, Harlow, Essex. As “Clerk in Holy Orders. Vicar of Latton”

1939 England and Wales Register
Rev. Austin Oliver
Vicar of Latton (1905–1942)
At The Vicarage, Latton. As “Clerk in Holy Orders. Vicar of Latton.”

References

 
Latton, Essex
Grade I listed churches in Essex
Mary